Max Barsky may refer to

David Starr (wrestler) (born 1991), American wrestler
Max Barskih (born 1990), Ukrainian singer